Emad Bahavar is an Iranian political activist affiliated with the Freedom Movement of Iran and currently holding office as head of the party's youth wing.

Bahavar was arrested following the post-election protests in 2009, and released after five years of imprisonment. He went on hunger strike in 2011, along with eleven other political prisoners.

Bahavar registered to run for a City Council of Tehran seat in 2017 elections, however he was disqualified by the authorities.

References

1978 births
Living people
Amnesty International prisoners of conscience held by Iran
Heads of youth wing of the Freedom Movement of Iran
Iranian business executives